Froxfield Green is a village in the East Hampshire district of Hampshire, England. It is 3.1 miles (4.9 km) west of Petersfield and is located just north of the A272 road.

The nearest railway station is 2.7 miles (4.4 km) east of the village, at Petersfield.

External links

Villages in Hampshire